Alexandra T. Croom BA  is a British archaeologist and museum curator.

Career
Croom is the Keeper of Archaeology at Tyne & Wear Archives & Museums. She was elected as a Fellow of the Society of Antiquaries of London on 29 April 2010.

Exhibitions
Croom has been involved in the planning and delivery of several exhibitions for Tyne & Wear Archives & Museum including:
The Glory of Rome: Arbeia’s Greatest Treasures (2014): An exhibition at Arbeia fort.
Saving Face (2018): An exhibition of a private collections of Roman helmet cheek-pieces.
Borderline Funny (2019): An exhibition in Segedunum of modern cartoons related to Hadrian's Wall.

Select publications
Bidwell, P. T., Croom, A., Snape, M. E. 1999. Hardknott Roman Fort, Cumbria : including an account of the excavations by the late Dorothy Charlesworth. Kendal : Cumberland and Westmorland Antiquarian and Archaeological Society
Croom, A. T. and Griffiths, W. B. (eds) 2002. Re-enactment as Research : Proceedings of the Twelfth International Roman Military Equipment Conference, held at the Customs House, South Shields, UK, 24th-26th September 1999(Journal of Military Equipment Studies 11). Armatura Press. 
Croom, A. 2010. Roman Clothing and Fashion. Stroud, Amberley. 
Croom, A. 2010. Roman Furniture. Stroud, The History Press. 
Rushworth, A., Croom, A., Bishop, M. C., MacRae, C., Johnstone, M., 2016. Segedunum : excavations by Charles Daniels in the Roman fort at Wallsend (1975-1984). Volume 1 The structural remains. Oxford, Oxbow.

References

Living people
Year of birth missing (living people)
20th-century archaeologists
21st-century archaeologists
British women archaeologists
British women curators
Fellows of the Society of Antiquaries of London
Women classical scholars